The Honourable James Crookall Cain FCA  (19 March 1927 - 5 May 2019) was a Manx politician, who was the Speaker of the House of Keys and former Minister of the Isle of Man Government and Member of the House of Keys for the constituency of Douglas West.

He was elected as MHK in 1986 and re-elected in 1991.  Formerly he was a Chartered Accountant and Partner at Pannell Kerr Forster.

He became acting Speaker of the House of Keys in 1990, before taking on the role permanently in 1991.  He served until 1999.

Jim Cain died aged 92 on5 May 2019.

Governmental position

Chairman of the Insurance Authority, 1987-1988
Minister of Health and Social Security, 1989–1991

References

1954 births
Living people
Members of the House of Keys 1986–1991
Members of the House of Keys 1991–1996
20th-century Manx politicians